Delta Women is a non-governmental organization founded by Elsie Ijorogu-Reed. It primarily to enable the women of Delta State, Nigeria. The organization advocates for women rights, creates awareness and holds seminars on child abuse and campaigns on female sexual harassment in higher educational institutions. 
 
The organization is involved in awareness creation through blogging, publications, open letters and the use of social networks such as Facebook and Twitter

DeltaWomen was set up with the primary aim of transforming women in Delta State by providing them with the knowledge and tools they need to take their rightful place in society.

History of DeltaWomen

19 April 2010

Since its creation DeltaWomen as grown rapidly, thanks to national and international volunteers at the organisation. The organisation  now has offices and presence in Delta State, Nigeria, where it was created; London, United Kingdom, the organisation's first international office; and Houston, Texas, United States, being the latest office to be opened. In 2011, Delta Women's volunteer, Paola Brigneti won the UN Online Volunteering Award. In 2012, Delta Women's volunteer, Kirthi Jayakumar, won the UN Online Volunteering award.

Projects

The organisation currently runs various women empowering and community development products which are recursive every year, and in some cases, on a monthly bases. These are some of the products the organisation is currently and actively working on: Big Sister Initiative, Rural Women Empowerment, War against Women Violence, Mentorship and leadership initiative, DeltaWomen Against Teenage Pregnancy In Nigeria, Career Counseling /Workforce and Training Initiative, End Female Sexual Harassment In Nigeria Higher Educational Institutions

Big Sister Initiative

 
Equally, the Big Sister initiative is designed for members to mentor other members, serving as a listening ear in times of trouble, a resourceful heart in times of crisis, and the source of wisdom when counsel is needed.

With the big sister initiative, DeltaWomen aims to provide and make the following services assessable to everyone who requires the service: 
 
 Mentoring of young girls
 Mentoring of women by qualified and experienced women mentors
 A mentoring community built on trust and respect where advice on women and other related issues is provided
 Assisting mentors with up-to-date mentoring literatures
 Teaching and equipping mentees to become mentors themselves

Rural Women Empowerment

Rural women empowerment is another interesting initiative that addresses the needs of rural women, by encouraging them to play active roles in decision making efforts related to the health, social welfare and finances of their families through advocacy, increased business knowledge, training, education, mentorship and support.

War against Women Violence

Dear to Elsie's heart is the aspect of her NGO works that deals with the issue of violence against women. "DeltaWomen is highly engaged in the war against women violence," she declares. "We try to raise issues relating to this subject in government or public and educational institutions and with people in positions to do something about it. We also vigorously campaign against sexual harassment of women, which goes hand in hand with violence against women.

References

External links
 Organisation website
 Organisation blogging website
Social media stimulates Nigerian debate on sexual violence
 Trafficking Police Detain Rivers Mother For Forcefully Pimping Daughter
residents walk to protest ABSU rape
Nigeria: New Hope for Identifying Cervical Cancer

Women's rights organizations
Organizations established in 2010
Women's organizations based in Nigeria
2010 establishments in Nigeria